John Plumptre was an Anglican dean and author.

Born on 11 March 1754, he was educated at Eton and King's College, Cambridge (elected Fellow, 1776).  From 1778 until his death on 26 November 1825 he was Vicar of Stone, Worcestershire; to which he added, in 1790, the living at Wichenford; and, in 1808, the office of Dean of Gloucester.

References

1754 births
1825 deaths
Deans of Gloucester
Fellows of King's College, Cambridge
People educated at Eton College
Place of birth missing
Place of death missing